Thomas Wodehouse Legh, 2nd Baron Newton PC, DL (18 March 1857 – 21 March 1942) was a British diplomat and Conservative politician who served as Paymaster-General during the First World War.

Background and education
Newton was the son of William Legh, 1st Baron Newton, and Emily Jane Wodehouse, daughter of the Venerable Charles Nourse Wodehouse, Archdeacon of Norwich. The Legh family had been landowners in Cheshire for centuries. Newton was educated at Eton and Christ Church, Oxford.

Political and administrative career
In 1879 he entered the Diplomatic Service and served as an attaché at the British Embassy in Paris from 1881 to 1886. The latter year he was elected to the House of Commons as Member of Parliament for his home constituency of Newton, a seat he held until 1898, when he succeeded his father as 2nd Baron Newton and took his seat in the House of Lords. He was appointed a deputy lieutenant of Cheshire on 23 February 1901. In 1915 Prime Minister H. H. Asquith appointed him Paymaster-General, with special responsibility for representing the War Office in Parliament when the Secretary of State for War was unable to attend. The same year he was admitted to the Privy Council.

In 1916 Lord Newton became Assistant Under-Secretary of State for Foreign Affairs, and was put in charge of two departments at the Foreign Office, one dealing with foreign propaganda and the other with prisoners of war. In October 1916 he was appointed controller of the newly established Prisoner of War Department, and in this position he negotiated the release of thousands of British prisoners of war.

Lord Newton was appointed a deputy lieutenant for Cheshire in February 1901. He served as an officer in the Lancashire Hussars Imperial Yeomanry, and was promoted to the substantive rank of major on 1 July 1901, before he resigned with the honorary rank of lieutenant-colonel in October 1902.

Lord Newton was also the author of two biographies, one on Richard Lyons, 1st Viscount Lyons, published in 1913, and the other on Henry Petty-Fitzmaurice, 5th Marquess of Lansdowne, published in 1929. In 1941 he published his memoirs, entitled Retrospection.

Family

Lord Newton married Evelyn Caroline Davenport, daughter of William Bromley-Davenport, in 1880. They had five children, two sons and three daughters. His younger son Sir Piers Legh served as Master of the Household from 1941 to 1953. Lady Newton died in September 1931. Lord Newton survived her by eleven years and died in March, 1942, aged 85. He was succeeded in the barony by his eldest son Richard Legh. The latter's son, Peter Legh, 4th Baron Newton, was also a Conservative politician and government minister.

Arms

References

External links 
 
 
 

1857 births
1942 deaths
Alumni of Christ Church, Oxford
Barons in the Peerage of the United Kingdom
Deputy Lieutenants of Cheshire
Legh, Thomas Wodehouse
People educated at Eton College
Legh, Thomas Wodehouse
Legh, Thomas Wodehouse
Legh, Thomas Wodehouse
Newton, B2
Conservative Party (UK) MPs for English constituencies
Members of the Privy Council of the United Kingdom
Lancashire Hussars officers